Seven Years of Night is a 2018 South Korean action drama film directed by Choo Chang-min, starring Ryu Seung-ryong, Jang Dong-gun, Song Sae-byeok and Go Kyung-pyo. The film is based on Jung Yoo-jung's novel of the same name. It was released on March 28, 2018.

Plot
The story of a man who plots revenge against the son of his daughter's murderer over a period of seven years.

Cast
Ryu Seung-ryong as Choi Hyun-soo
Jung Joon-won as young Hyun-soo
A man who is haunted by an unintended murder of a young girl seven years ago.
Jang Dong-gun as Oh Young-je

The father who seeks revenge for his murdered daughter.
Song Sae-byeok as Ahn Seung-hwan
Hyun-soo's co-worker.
Go Kyung-pyo as Seo-won
Tang Joon-sang as Young Seo-won 
Hyun-soo's son.
Moon Jeong-hee as Kang Eun-joo
Sung Byung-sook as Ha-yong's mother
Lee Re as Oh Se-ryeong
Kim Hyun as Woman who lost her husband
Jeon Bae-soo as Hyeon-tae
Jeong Seok-yong

Production and release
Filming began on November 19, 2016, and completed on May 25, 2016.

After nearly two years since the film was completed, the local release was set for March 28, 2018.

Awards and nominations

References

External links

 Seven Years of Night at Daum (Korean)
 Seven Years of Night at Naver (Korean)

2018 films
2018 action drama films
South Korean action drama films
Films based on Korean novels
CJ Entertainment films
2010s South Korean films